Plymouth Cricket can refer to two badge-engineered automobiles associated with Plymouth.

  Hillman Avenger, an automobile sold in North America between 1971 and 1973
  Dodge Colt, an automobile sold in Canada between 1973 and 1975

Cricket